Frank Blackfire (born Frank Gosdzik, 24 February 1966) is a German guitarist, who is best known as a member of the influential thrash metal bands Sodom and Kreator.

Career
Gosdzik was born in Essen. Inspired by attending an AC/DC concert, he began playing the guitar at the age of eleven. After first attempts with his self-founded band Midia, he joined Sodom in 1987, who were originating from Gelsenkirchen, and with whom he had previously shared the rehearsal room.

Taking his lead from the pseudonyms of his new bandmates at Sodom, Tom Angelripper and Chris Witchhunter, Gosdzik called himself "Frank Blackfire". Because of his playing skills he had a significant share of the musical development and direction of Sodom and played on an EP and on the album Persecution Mania (1987). In 1989, the album Agent Orange followed.

In July 1989, Blackfire left Sodom due to personal differences and joined Essen's Kreator, another pioneer band of the German thrash scene. Three commercially successful studio albums under Blackfire's participation followed, Coma of Souls (1990), Renewal (1992), and the 1995 released Cause for Conflict, which again reached the German charts. In 1994, Blackfire worked with the Brazilian women's band Volkana on their album Mindtrips.

In 1997, Blackfire decided to leave Kreator and pursue various experimental musical styles. He worked with jazz influences, played percussion and founded a classic rock specialized cover band. On the 1998 debut album Sceptre of Black Knowledge of the German black metal band Black Messiah Blackfire appeared as a guest musician.

At the end of 2000, Blackfire moved to São Paulo, Brazil, where he earned his living as a guitar teacher and, in the fall of 2001, re-founded his own band, Mystic, in which he also plays as a singer and musically ties on to his thrash roots from the 1980s. After two demos, Blackfire returned to the Ruhrgebiet area in mid-2006 and continued his band under the new name Blackfire. At the Wacken Open Air 2009, he appeared as a guest guitarist with the thrash metal band Whiplash. In 2016, Blackfire replaced Michael Hoffmann as a guitarist with Assassin. In January 2018, Tom Angelripper announced the return of Frank Blackfire to Sodom.

Personal life
Blackfire is married and has a daughter.

References

1966 births
German guitarists
Kreator members
Lead guitarists
Living people
Musicians from Essen
Sodom (band) members